The 1950 Kilkenny Senior Hurling Championship was the 56th staging of the Kilkenny Senior Hurling Championship since its establishment by the Kilkenny County Board.

On 26 November 1950, Dicksboro won the championship after a 4-06 to 1-05 defeat of Éire Óg in the final. It was their third championship title overall and their first title since 1926.

Results

Finals

References

Kilkenny Senior Hurling Championship
Kilkenny Senior Hurling Championship